The First Fleet class is a class of ferry operated by Transdev Sydney Ferries on Sydney Harbour.

History
In the early 1980s, the Urban Transit Authority ordered nine catamaran ferries from Carrington Slipways, Tomago. They were to replace the K-class and wooden Lady class ferries on Sydney Harbour. The new vessels were named after ships of the First Fleet and were delivered between 1984 and 1986.  It was originally intended that they would operate services on the Parramatta River, but they generated too much wash.

In 2006/07, the class were repowered with MTU Series 60 engines. Today, all nine remain in service with Transdev Sydney Ferries. 

In 2020, the 35-year old ferries underwent a major facelift to provide them with another 10 years of service. The work was undertaken at Port Macquarie. The changes included engines, refurbished interiors, the provision of air conditioning and additional safety features. The first vessel to be upgraded and returned to service was Golden Grove.

Vessels

See also
 List of Sydney Harbour ferries
 Timeline of Sydney Harbour ferries

References

External links

Catamarans
Ferry transport in Sydney
Ships built in New South Wales
Ferry classes